Rachel Schill (born June 9, 1982 in Kitchener, Ontario) is a Canadian softball center fielder. She started softball at age 10, and has attended Simon Fraser University. She was a part of the Canadian Softball team who finished 9th at the 2002 World Championships in Saskatoon, Saskatchewan and part of the Canadian Softball team who finished 5th at the 2004 Summer Olympics.

References

1982 births
Canadian softball players
Living people
Olympic softball players of Canada
Simon Fraser University alumni
Softball players at the 2004 Summer Olympics
Sportspeople from Kitchener, Ontario